Taylor Village is an unincorporated community in Westmorland County, New Brunswick. The community is situated in Southeastern New Brunswick, to the south-east of Moncton.

History

Notable people

See also
List of communities in New Brunswick

Bordering communities

References

Communities in Westmorland County, New Brunswick
Communities in Greater Moncton